Hopea cordata is a species of plant in the family Dipterocarpaceae. It is endemic to Vietnam.

References

cordata
Endemic flora of Vietnam
Trees of Vietnam
Critically endangered flora of Asia
Taxonomy articles created by Polbot